Igor Ležaić (born 25 April 1988) is a Croatian-Serbian football forward who plays for Omladinac Novi Banovci.

References

External links
Corgoň Liga profile 
Eurofotbal profile 
 

1988 births
Living people
Footballers from Belgrade
Association football forwards
Croatian footballers
FK Radnički Beograd players
FK Palilulac Beograd players
FK Srem Jakovo players
FK Drina Zvornik players
FC ŠTK 1914 Šamorín players
ŠK Senec players
FK Železiarne Podbrezová players
Premier League of Bosnia and Herzegovina players
2. Liga (Slovakia) players
Slovak Super Liga players
Croatian expatriate footballers
Expatriate footballers in Slovakia
Croatian expatriate sportspeople in Bosnia and Herzegovina